Holly Taylor is a Canadian and American actress and dancer. She began her career in the Broadway production of Billy Elliot at the age of eleven as Sharon Percy (Ballet Girl) and continued in the role for almost two years. She played the role of Paige Jennings in the FX television series The Americans for its entire run, for which she received a nomination for the Critics' Choice Television Award for Best Supporting Actress in a Drama Series in 2019. In addition, she portrays Angelina Meyer, one of the airplane survivors, in the NBC/Netflix science fiction series Manifest.

Early life
 
Taylor was born in Middleton, Nova Scotia, Canada, the daughter of Irish mother Margaret and Scottish father Mark. She has an older brother named Philip. After her family moved to New Jersey in early 2000, she was enrolled in a dance class at age three. About a year later, she surprised her parents by announcing that she was going to dance on Broadway when she grew up.

Career
By the time she was eleven years old, Taylor was dancing eight shows a week as a member of the cast of Billy Elliot at the Imperial Theatre in New York City.

Taylor attended middle school in her hometown in New Jersey as much as the Billy Elliot schedule would allow and kept up her academics. She was invited to attend the Johns Hopkins program for Gifted and Talented Children, and the following year was invited to the International Student Exchange program for Gifted Children.

Billy Elliot lasted 22 months. After that, she started looking into acting more, although she was so shy it was difficult at first. "But then, the more I started to do it, the more I came out of my shell and the more I enjoyed it", she said.

She did an audition tape for the spy thriller television series The Americans in Los Angeles and booked the show after having a chance to meet the producers in New York.

In 2021, Taylor joined the third season of Manifest as Angelina Meyer.

Personal life
Taylor has lived in Wayne, New Jersey, since she was two years old. She graduated from Wayne Hills High School in 2016.

She studied graphic design at Kean University in Union, New Jersey and graduated in spring 2021 with Bachelor of Fine Arts.

Filmography

Awards and nominations

References

External links 

 
 

Living people
Actresses from New Jersey
Actresses from Nova Scotia
21st-century American actresses
American child actresses
American film actresses
American stage actresses
American television actresses
21st-century Canadian actresses
Canadian child actresses
Canadian film actresses
Canadian stage actresses
Canadian television actresses
People from Middleton, Nova Scotia
People from Wayne, New Jersey
Canadian people of Irish descent
Canadian people of Scottish descent
Canadian emigrants to the United States
People with acquired American citizenship
American people of Irish descent
American people of Scottish descent
American female dancers
Canadian female dancers
Wayne Hills High School alumni
1997 births